Ostrocerca is a genus of spring stoneflies in the family Nemouridae. There are about six described species in Ostrocerca.

Species
These six species belong to the genus Ostrocerca:
 Ostrocerca albidipennis (Walker, 1852) (white-tailed forestfly)
 Ostrocerca complexa (Claassen, 1937) (notched forestfly)
 Ostrocerca dimicki (Frison, 1936) (hooked forestfly)
 Ostrocerca foersteri (Ricker, 1943)
 Ostrocerca prolongata (Claassen, 1923) (bent forestfly)
 Ostrocerca truncata (Claassen, 1923) (truncate forestfly)

References

Further reading

 
 
 
 
 
 
 

Nemouridae